The Closter Public Schools are a community public school district that educates students in pre-kindergarten through eighth grade from Closter in Bergen County, New Jersey, United States.

As of the 2018–19 school year, the district, comprised of two schools, had an enrollment of 1,203 students and 94.5 classroom teachers (on an FTE basis), for a student–teacher ratio of 12.7:1.

The district is classified by the New Jersey Department of Education as being in District Factor Group "I", the second-highest of eight groupings. District Factor Groups organize districts statewide to allow comparison by common socioeconomic characteristics of the local districts. From lowest socioeconomic status to highest, the categories are A, B, CD, DE, FG, GH, I and J.

Students in ninth through twelfth grades attend Northern Valley Regional High School at Demarest in Demarest, together with students from Demarest and Haworth. The high school is part of the Northern Valley Regional High School District, which also serves students from Harrington Park, Northvale, Norwood and Old Tappan. During the 1994-96 school years, Northern Valley Regional High School at Demarest was awarded the Blue Ribbon School Award of Excellence by the United States Department of Education. As of the 2018–19 school year, the high school had an enrollment of 1,038 students and 97.4 classroom teachers (on an FTE basis), for a student–teacher ratio of 10.7:1.

The district participates in special education programs offered by Region III, one of seven such regional programs in Bergen County. Region III coordinates and develops special education programs for the 1,000 students with learning disabilities in the region, which also includes the Alpine, Demarest, Harrington Park, Haworth, Northvale, Norwood and Old Tappan districts, as well as the Northern Valley Regional High School District.

History
Closter High School opened in 1912 and was closed in 1955 when the district became a constituent municipality in the Northern Valley Regional High School District and students began attending Northern Valley Regional High School at Demarest. The defunct high school became Village Middle School. which operated until 1996.

Schools 
Schools in the district (with 2019–20 enrollment data from the National Center for Education Statistics) are:
Hillside Elementary School with 634 students in grades PreK-4 (located on 340 Homans Avenue)
Dianne Smith, Principal
Tenakill Middle School with 532 students in grades 5-8 (located on 275 High Street)
William M. Tantum, Principal

Administration 
Core members of the district's administration are:
Vincent McHale, Superintendent
Floro M. Villanueva Jr., Business Administrator / Board Secretary

Board of education
The district's board of education, comprised of nine members, sets policy and oversees the fiscal and educational operation of the district through its administration. As a Type II school district, the board's trustees are elected directly by voters to serve three-year terms of office on a staggered basis, with three seats up for election each year held (since 2013) as part of the November general election. The board appoints a superintendent to oversee the district's day-to-day operations and a business administrator to supervise the business functions of the district.

References

External links 
Closter Public Schools

School Data for the Closter Public Schools, National Center for Education Statistics
Northern Valley Regional High School District

Closter, New Jersey
New Jersey District Factor Group I
School districts in Bergen County, New Jersey